The Nine (also known as The Seven) is a Scottish news bulletin on the BBC Scotland channel which started on 25 February 2019, and is the channel's flagship news programme.

Broadcast
Produced by BBC News, the 60-minute programme is broadcast on BBC Scotland at 9:00pm. The Friday and Weekend edition of the programme is aired at 7:00pm and lasts for a shorter 30 minutes on Fridays and 15 minutes on weekends.

Presenters
The programme has a fifteen strong team of presenters and reporters, who present Scottish, UK, and international news from a Scottish perspective. It originally was presented by Rebecca Curran and Martin Geissler from Monday to Thursday and Laura Miller and John Beattie on Fridays. Weekends are hosted by the Reporting Scotland team. Amy Irons and her brother Lewis Irons are the main sports presenters since 2022, with original sport news presenter Laura McGhie currently presenting on the BBC News and World News channels.

Current on-air team

References

External links

2019 Scottish television series debuts
2010s Scottish television series
2020s Scottish television series
BBC Regional News shows
BBC Scotland television shows
Scottish television news shows